Adelaide is the English form of a Germanic given name, from the Old High German Adalheidis, meaning "noble natured".

The modern German form is Adelheid, famously the first name of Queen Adelaide, for whom many places throughout the former British Empire were named.

The French form is Adélaïde or Adélaide and Czech is Adéla or Adléta. The name Addie is a diminutive of Adelaide and Heidi is a nickname for Adelheid which became internationally popular on its own as a result of Johanna Spyri's novel Heidi (1880).

People with the name
Notable people so named include:

Nobles
 Saint Adelaide of Italy (died 999), wife of Otto the Great
 Adelaide of Aquitaine (died 1004)
 Saint Adelaide, Abbess of Vilich (died 1015)
 Adelaide of Susa (died 1091)
 Adelaide del Vasto (died 1118)
 Adelaide, Countess of Vermandois (died 1120 or 1124)
 Adélaide de Maurienne (1092–1154)
 Adelaide of Poland (died 1211)
 Adelaide of Holland  (1230–1284)
 Adélaïde of France (1732–1800)
 Adélaïde d'Orléans (1777–1847)
 Adelaide of Saxe-Meiningen (1792–1849), Queen Consort of William IV of the United Kingdom
 Adelaide of Löwenstein-Wertheim-Rosenberg (1831–1909) Queen Consort of Miguel I of Portugal

Other people
 Adelaide Steele Baylor (1860–1935), American educator and school administrator
 Adelaide George Bennett (1848–1911), American poet and botanist
 Adelaide Avery Claflin (1846–1931), American woman suffragist and ordained minister
 Adelaide Clemens (born 1989), Australian actress
 Adélaïde Dufrénoy (1765–1825), French poet and painter
 Adelaide Dutcher (fl. 1901), American physician and public health worker
 Adelaida Ferré Gomis (1881-1955), historian, teacher, and folklorist of Catalan lace-making
 Adelaide Fischer (1889–c.1950), American soprano singer
 Adelaide Hall (1901–1993), American jazz singer
 Adélaïde Victoire Hall (1772–1844), painter
 Adelaide Hawkins (1914–2008), American cryptologist
 Adelaide Hoodless (1858–1910), Canadian educational reformer
 Adelaide Kane (born 1990), Australian actress
 Adelaide Knight (1871–1950), British suffragette
 Adélaïde Labille-Guiard (1749–1803), French history and portrait painter
 Adélaïde Leroux (born 1982), French actress
 Adelaide Miethke (1881–1962), Australian educator
 Adelaide Neri (1940–2018), Brazilian teacher and politician 
 Adelaide Anne Procter (1825–1864), English poet and philanthropist
 Adelaide Day Rollston (1854–1941), American poet and author
 Adelaide Thompson Spurgeon (c.1826–1907), American Civil War nurse
 Adelaide Cilley Waldron (1843-1909), American author, editor, clubwoman
 Adelaide Wallerstein (1869–1942), American translator, medical doctor, lawyer and clubwoman
 Mary Adelaide Dickey (1884-1960), American vaudeville performer known as 'La Petite Adelaide'
 T. Adelaide Goodno (1858-1931), American social reformer

Fictional characters
 Adelaide, a character on the television series Over the Garden Wall
 Miss Adelaide, a character in the musical Guys and Dolls
 Adelaide Brubaker, a character on the television series Diff'rent Strokes
 Adelaide "Addy" Wilson, a character on the television series Gimme a Break!
Adelaide "Addy" Wilson, née Thomas, a character in the 2019 movie Us
Adelaide Brooke, base commander in Doctor Who episode "The Waters of Mars" 
Madame Adelaide Bonfamille, a character in the Disney movie The Aristocats 
Adelaide Chang, the younger sister of Sid Chang in The Casagrandes
Aunt Adelaide, a character from the 2005 movie Nanny McPhee
Adelaide "Ada-1" Meyrin, an Exo gunsmith and head of the Black Armory in Destiny 2
Adelheid, a character from the 2015 movie “Heidi”
 Adelaide "Addy" Muchmore, a character from Taffy, the granddaughter of Mrs. Muchmore

See also
 Adelais
 Adelheid
 Alice (given name)
 Marie Adelaide (disambiguation)

References

English feminine given names
French feminine given names